Joop Alberda (born 25 October 1952 in Oosterwolde, Friesland) is a retired volleyball coach from the Netherlands.

In 1996, under his directions, the Dutch Men's National Team won the gold medal in Atlanta, Georgia by defeating Italy in the final (3-2).

During his time as an active player he played on the highest national level as setter for the teams of Lycurgus and Donitas from the city of Groningen.

He found that he had a knack for the training and coaching side of sport in general and Volleyball in particular.
A major inspiration in this aspect was Doug Beal, whom he met in 1985.
Beal had guided the US national men's team to Olympic gold in the previous year, and his strategic approach appealed greatly to Alberda: controlling every possible detail, leaving nothing to chance.

In 1994 Alberda was appointed as head coach of the Dutch national men's volleyball team which had already been under way to international fame.
Two years later this led to the gold medal in the 1996 Olympics.

Later the Dutch population elected this event as most important national sporting even of the twentieth century.

In 1996 Alberda himself was elected as "best volleyball coach in the world".

In 1997 he filled the position of technical director of the NOC*NSF, the Dutch national Olympic Federation.

Under his guidance the Dutch delegation in the 2000 Sydney Olympics managed to win a record number of 25 medals.

At the end of 2004 he quit his position at NOC*NSF.

In October 2014 he was inducted in the Volleyball Hall of Fame.

Joop Alberda is father of two children and lives in the Dutch town of Vinkeveen.

References

1951 births
Living people
Dutch men's volleyball players
Dutch volleyball coaches
People from Ooststellingwerf
Medalists at the 1996 Summer Olympics
Olympic gold medalists for the Netherlands
Sportspeople from Friesland
20th-century Dutch people